The 1980 New York Jets season was the 21st season for the franchise and its eleventh in the National Football League. It began with the team trying to improve upon its 8–8 record from 1979 under head coach Walt Michaels, and being widely predicted to improve further and reach the postseason for the first time since 1969. The Jets finished the season with a record of 4–12.

During the season, the Jets were the only team to lose to the notorious New Orleans Saints team, dubbed the “Aints”.

History repeated itself 11 years later, when the Jets lost 28–27 at home to the Indianapolis Colts, the Colts’ lone victory of that season.

Offseason

Draft

Personnel

Staff

Roster

Regular season

Schedule 

Note: Intra-division opponents are in bold text.

Standings

Season summary

Week 1 vs Colts

Week 2 at Bills

References

External links 
 1980 statistics

New York Jets seasons
New York Jets
New York Jets season
1980s in Queens